Kieran Tierney (born 5 June 1997) is a Scottish professional footballer who plays as a left-back or centre-back for Premier League club Arsenal and the Scotland national team.

Tierney came through the Celtic youth system and made his first team debut in April 2015, and his full international debut in March 2016. He joined Arsenal in August 2019 for a fee reported at £25 million, a record amount both for a Scottish national and for a player from the Scottish league.

Club career

Early life and youth football
Born in Douglas on the Isle of Man, Tierney moved to Wishaw in Scotland aged 10 months. He supported Celtic as a child and signed for the club when he was 7 years old. He was educated at Motherwell schools St Brendan's RC Primary and Our Lady's High (one year group behind fellow footballers, twins Nicky and Chris Cadden) then attended St Ninian's High School, Kirkintilloch, which has a development partnership with Celtic. He has spoken of his hope of emulating the late Tommy Gemmell, a member of the Lisbon Lions team who also grew up in Wishaw (specifically, Craigneuk) and played in the same position.

He progressed through the various youth ranks and earned a reputation as a dependable wide player in the club's development squad, both in defence and attack. He travelled with the first team squad on a pre-season trip to Finland in August 2014, and made his debut in a friendly against Tottenham Hotspur there. Although Celtic lost, Tierney described his first appearance for the first team as a "dream come true". He continued to play in the development squad throughout 2014–15, and in October 2014 during a Development League match against Heart of Midlothian he scored a goal from the edge of his own penalty box.

Celtic

2015–16: Debut and breakthrough
Tierney made his competitive senior debut for Celtic on 22 April 2015, coming on as an 81st-minute substitute in a Scottish Premiership match against Dundee. He made one further first team appearance that season, playing over an hour in a league match away at St Johnstone.

Tierney enjoyed a breakthrough season in 2015–16, appearing in over 30 matches and displacing the more experienced Emilio Izaguirre as first-choice left back. For his performances he was awarded with both the Players' and Writers' Young Player annual awards, while Celtic also won the league title. Despite interest from Premier League clubs, Tierney signed a new five-year contract on 24 June 2016, keeping him at Parkhead until 2021. After making his first appearances in the group stage of the UEFA Champions League, Tierney suffered ankle ligament damage during training on 27 October 2016 and was initially ruled out of action for two months. During the layoff, which caused him to miss the League Cup Final, he received treatment on a recurring shoulder injury and attended several Celtic matches as a typical supporter in the company of his childhood friends.

2017–2019: Back-to-back domestic trebles
On 22 January 2017, after missing three months, he made his long-awaited return to the Celtic team in a Scottish Cup tie against Albion Rovers. Tierney was crowned PFA Scotland Young Player of the Year for the second consecutive season on 7 May, making him the first to achieve this since Craig Levein in 1986. He suffered a jaw injury early in the 2017 Scottish Cup Final and had to be substituted for treatment. Celtic won the match 2–1 to complete a domestic treble and undefeated season. In spite of his lengthy injury absence, he featured in 40 matches during the campaign.

On 8 August 2017, Tierney was named as captain while also moving to central defender to command a back line of teenagers in a Scottish League Cup fixture against Kilmarnock; Celtic won the game 5–0, with Tierney providing an assist and scoring with a "wonderful strike" from 40 yards. On 30 October, a week after scoring in an important league victory away to closest challengers Aberdeen, he extended his contract with Celtic until 2023.

By the end of the season, he had collected further personal accolades—winning both the Players' and Writers' Young Player awards for the third campaign in succession—and performed a major role in securing a historic 'double treble' for the club, making more than 50 appearances and playing the entirety of the domestic cup finals, both being 2–0 wins over Motherwell. Tierney played in Celtic's victory over Aberdeen in the 2018 Scottish League Cup Final on 2 December 2018. Soon afterwards a hip injury meant that he was ruled out of action, returning on 24 February 2019. He then suffered from a hernia, which subsequently required surgery.

Arsenal

2019–2022: FA Cup win and injuries
On 8 August 2019, Tierney signed for Premier League club Arsenal, for a reported £25 million fee. Tierney missed the early part of the 2019–20 season, having undergone a double hernia operation in May 2019. He made his first-team debut for Arsenal in a 5–0 win against Nottingham Forest in the EFL Cup on 24 September. Tierney assisted the first goal in a 4–0 home win against Standard Liège scored by Gabriel Martinelli a week later. He made his first appearance in the Premier League on 27 October, in a 2–2 draw with Crystal Palace. His season was further disrupted after suffering a dislocated shoulder in the game against West Ham United.

Tierney's impressive performances for Arsenal following the resumption of the Premier League after the COVID-19 pandemic saw him receive Arsenal's Player of the Month award for June. He scored his first goal for Arsenal on 26 July, in a 3–2 win against Watford on the final day of the 2019–20 Premier League season. On 1 August 2020, Tierney was selected to start in the FA Cup Final against Chelsea, as Arsenal won their 14th FA Cup.

On 28 August 2020, Tierney was in the starting 11 in the 2020 FA Community Shield, which Arsenal clinched a 5–4 victory over Liverpool in the penalty shootout after the match was 1–1 after 90 minutes. On 2 January 2021, Tierney scored the opening goal in a 4–0 away league win over West Bromwich Albion and later assisted the final goal, scored by Alexandre Lacazette. His stunning strike was subsequently voted the January Goal of the Month on the Arsenal official website. On 25 February, he scored a goal in a 3–2 win over Benfica in the Europa League round of 32, making him the first Scotsman to score for Arsenal in a European competition since Willie Young in March 1980. In June 2021, he signed a long-term contract with Arsenal.

Tierney played regularly for Arsenal during the 2021–22 season until suffering a season-ending knee injury in March. Arsenal lost league games against Crystal Palace, Brighton, Tottenham and Newcastle following his injury, and they narrowly missed out on Champions League qualification. It was later revealed in the All or Nothing: Arsenal series that Tierney had hyper-extended the knee during a game in February, but aggravated it a month later while walking in the Arsenal training ground. He returned to action at the start of the 2022–23 season.

Arsenal signed Oleksandr Zinchenko from Manchester City during the summer of 2022, and during the 2022–23 season the Ukrainian played most Premier League minutes at left-back ahead of Tierney. This led to speculation that Tierney would look to leave Arsenal during the summer of 2023.

International career
Tierney played for Scotland at Scotland U18 and Scotland U19 levels. He had also considered playing for the Ellan Vannin team that represents the Isle of Man when the ConIFA World Cup competition was being held.

Tierney received his first call-up to the senior Scotland squad on 10 March 2016 for a friendly against Denmark. Tierney played for the first half of the match, which Scotland won 1–0 at Hampden Park; he was replaced at the break by his Celtic teammate Charlie Mulgrew.

Due to his greater versatility compared to fellow left-back Andrew Robertson, Tierney was deployed at right-back in Scotland's matches against Slovenia, Lithuania and Slovakia, and on the left of a three-man defence in the fixture at home to England during World Cup qualifiers in 2017.

Tierney was selected as Scotland captain for a friendly match against the Netherlands in November 2017, where he played as a central defender in a 1–0 defeat.

In October 2018, Tierney scored a decisive own goal in a 2–1 loss to Israel in a UEFA Nations League fixture. Speaking after the game, Robertson said that both he and Tierney were being played out of position in the 3–5–2 system adopted by Alex McLeish to accommodate both players.

In November 2019, Tierney withdrew from the Scotland squad ahead of their UEFA Euro 2020 qualifiers against Cyprus and Kazakhstan due to a hip injury. In October 2020, he was required to pull out of the squad for a Euro 2020 play-off semi-final against Israel after being in close contact with Stuart Armstrong, who had tested positive for COVID-19. It was later confirmed by Armstrong, Tierney and Ryan Christie that they had been playing video games in the same room.

Tierney provided three assists in a 4–0 win against the Faroe Islands on 31 March 2021, despite playing from a central defensive position. He then played in two of Scotland's matches at the delayed UEFA Euro 2020 finals in June 2021, as he missed the opening match with Czech Republic due to injury.

Tierney scored his first goal for Scotland on 24 March 2022, in a friendly against Poland at Hampden. Soon afterwards he suffered a training ground injury that kept him out of action for the rest of the 2021–22 season. This caused him to miss a World Cup playoff against Ukraine in June, which Scotland lost 3–1.

Media
Tierney was involved in the Amazon Original sports docuseries All or Nothing: Arsenal, which documented the club by spending time with the coaching staff and players behind the scenes both on and off the field throughout their 2021–22 season.

Personal life

Tierney became an ambassador for the Scottish Society for Prevention of Cruelty to Animals (SSPCA) in June 2021.

Career statistics

Club

International

Scotland score listed first, score column indicates score after each Tierney goal.

Honours
Celtic
Scottish Premiership: 2015–16, 2016–17, 2017–18, 2018–19
Scottish Cup: 2016–17, 2017–18
Scottish League Cup: 2017–18, 2018–19

Arsenal
FA Cup: 2019–20
FA Community Shield: 2020

Individual
UEFA Champions League Breakthrough XI: 2017
PFA Scotland Young Player of the Year: 2015–16, 2016–17, 2017–18
SFWA Young Player of the Year: 2015–16, 2016–17, 2017–18
Celtic Young Player of the Year: 2015–16, 2016–17, 2017–18
SFSA Supporters' Player of the Year: 2017
Scottish Premiership Player of the Month: October 2017
PFA Scotland Team of the Year (Premiership): 2015–16, 2016–17 2017–18
PFA Scotland Goal of the Season: 2017–18
Celtic FC Goal of the Season: 2017–18

See also
 List of Scotland international footballers born outside Scotland
 List of Scotland national football team captains

References

External links

 Profile at the Arsenal F.C. website
 Profile at the Premier League website
 
 
 
 
 Fitba Stats profile (Scotland)
 Fitba Stats profile (Celtic)
 

1997 births
Living people
People from Douglas, Isle of Man
People educated at Our Lady's High School, Motherwell
People educated at St Ninian's High School, Kirkintilloch
Sportspeople from Wishaw
Manx footballers
Scottish footballers
Footballers from North Lanarkshire
Association football fullbacks
Scotland international footballers
Scotland youth international footballers
UEFA Euro 2020 players
FA Cup Final players
Scottish Professional Football League players
Premier League players
Celtic F.C. players
Arsenal F.C. players